The Central Overland Route (also known as the "Central Overland Trail", "Central Route",  "Simpson's Route", or the "Egan Trail") was a transportation route from Salt Lake City, Utah south of the Great Salt Lake through the mountains of central Nevada to Carson City, Nevada. For a decade after 1859, until the first Transcontinental Railroad was completed in 1869, it served a vital role in the transport of emigrants, mail, freight, and passengers between California, Nevada, and Utah.

History
The route was initially scouted in 1855 by Howard Egan, and used by him to drive livestock between Salt Lake City and California.  The trail Egan used led straight through the high mountain ranges that most earlier explorers had worked so hard to avoid.

Egan had discovered a series of mountain passes and mountain springs that aligned to allow an almost straight path across the middle of Utah and Nevada.  The Schell Creek Range could be crossed at Schellbourne Pass, the Cherry Creek Range at Egan Canyon, the Ruby Mountains at Overland Pass, the Diamond Mountains at another Overland Pass, the Toiyabe Range at Emigrant Pass, and the Desatoya Mountains at Basque Summit (all of these place names came later).

Although many smaller ranges and two large deserts also had to be traversed, the reduction in length over the "standard" California Trail route along the Humboldt River by about  made this route about two weeks faster for emigrants getting to (or from) California. After it was developed many California emigrants and returning emigrants used this route.

Improvement

In 1858, hearing of Egan's Trail, the U.S. Army sent an expedition led by Captain James H. Simpson to survey it for a military road to get supplies to the Army's Camp Floyd in Utah. Simpson came back with a surveyed route that was also about  shorter than the "standard" California Trail route along the Humboldt River.

The Army then improved the trail and springs for use by wagons and stagecoaches in 1859 and 1860.  When the approaching American Civil War closed the heavily subsidized Butterfield Overland Mail southwestern route to California along the Gila River, George Chorpenning immediately realized the value of this more direct route, and shifted his existing mail and passenger line from the "Northern Humboldt Route" along the Humboldt River.

In 1861 John Butterfield, who since 1858 had been using the Butterfield Overland Mail route through the deserts of the American Southwest, also switched to the Central Route to avoid possible hostilities during the American Civil War.

Gold and Silver mined in California and Nevada were often part of the cargo going east as the Civil War consumed vast sums of money. Nearly all stage lines were heavily subsidized to carry the mail. After the American Civil War, Wells Fargo & Co. absorbed the Butterfield stage lines and ran stage coaches and freight wagons along the Central Route as well as developing the first agriculture in the Ruby Valley in Nevada to help support their livestock.  The Army established Fort Ruby at the southern end of Ruby Valley in Nevada to protect travelers against marauding Indians along the road. The Army abandoned Camp Floyd in 1860 as the soldiers were reassigned back east to fight the Civil War.

In 1860, William Russell's Pony Express used this route across Utah and Nevada for part of their fast 10-day mail delivery from St. Joseph, Missouri to Sacramento, California. In 1861, soon after the completion of the First Transcontinental Telegraph, the Pony Express was discontinued as the Transcontinental Telegraph now could provide quicker and cheaper communication from the East to the West.

Telegraph
Under pressure and subsidizes from the U.S. Congress to establish rapid east-west communication in 1860 Hiram Sibley, the president of the Western Union Company, formed a consortium between Western Union and the telegraph companies in California to construct the First Transcontinental Telegraph. The telegraph line was authorized and subsidized by the U.S. Congress and went from Omaha, Nebraska to Carson City, Nevada.

The newly consolidated Overland Telegraph Company of California, which had already built a telegraph line to Carson City, would build the line eastward from Carson City using the newly developed Central Route through Nevada and Utah. At the same time, the Pacific Telegraph Company of Nebraska, formed by Sibley, would construct a line westward from Omaha, Nebraska along the eastern part of the California and Oregon Trails. The lines would meet at a station in Salt Lake City, Utah.

Telegraph lines, insulators (shipped around Cape Horn to California) and telegraph poles for the line were collected in late 1860, and rapid construction proceeded during the second half of 1861. Major problems were encountered in finding telegraph poles on the treeless plains of the Midwest and the nearly treeless deserts of the Great Basin.  The telegraph line from Omaha reached Salt Lake City on October 18, 1861, and the line from Carson City to Salt Lake City was completed six days later, on October 24, 1861—about a year ahead of predictions.

Literary accounts

Several accounts of travel along the Central Route have been published.  In July 1859 Horace Greeley made the trip, at a time when Chorpenning was using only the eastern segment (they reconnected with the Humboldt River trail near present-day Beowawe).  Greeley published his detailed observations in his 1860 book "An Overland Journey from New York to San Francisco".

In October 1860 the English explorer Richard Burton traveled the entire route at a time when the Pony Express was operating.  He gave detailed descriptions of each of the way stations in his 1861 book The City of the Saints, Across the Rocky Mountains to California.

In the summer of 1861 Samuel Clemens (who only later used the pen name Mark Twain) traveled the route with his brother Orion on their way to Nevada's new territorial capital in Carson City, but provided only sparse descriptions of the road in his 1872 book Roughing It.

Obsolescence

In 1869 the First transcontinental railroad was completed using the more level route along the Humboldt River to the north—along much of the original California Trail route.  Passengers and freight were now carried faster and cheaper than on the stage and freight lines using the old route.

Alongside the railroad a new telegraph line was constructed.  It was easier to maintain and supply operators, relay stations, etc. using the railroad; the Central Route was now obsolete for the telegraph as well.  The stage and telegraph relay stations were abandoned, and the soldiers at Fort Ruby were transferred north to Fort Halleck to protect the railroad.

References

Further reading
"An Overland Journey from New York to San Francisco", by Horace Greeley (1860). Chapter XXV available at 
"The City of the Saints, Across the Rocky Mountains to California" by Richard Burton (1861). Available at 
"Roughing It" (Chapter 20), by Mark Twain (1872). Chapter XX available at 
"The Overland Mail", by Leroy R. Hafen (1929). A detailed account of the various mail lines.
Bureau of Land Management (BLM) Pony Express Map accessed 2 Jan 2011
Patterson, Eda; Ulph, Louise and Goodwin, Victor; "Nevada's Northeast Frontier", Univ of Nevada (July 1991), 

 
History of the Great Basin
Historic trails and roads in California
Historic trails and roads in Nevada
Historic trails and roads in Utah